Myzia is a genus of lady beetles in the family Coccinellidae. There are at least 3 described species in Myzia.

Species
 Myzia interrupta (Casey, 1899)
 Myzia pullata (Say, 1826) (streaked lady beetle)
 Myzia subvittata (Mulsant, 1850) (subvittate lady beetle)

References

Further reading

 
 
 
 

Coccinellidae
Coccinellidae genera